Murray Douglas Rance (born 25 January 1962) is a former Australian rules footballer who played with Footscray and West Coast in the Victorian Football League (VFL) during the late 1980s.

He was a key position player and started his career at Swan Districts with whom he won three consecutive premierships starting in 1982. After representing Western Australia at the interstate championships, Rance was recruited to Footscray and spent two seasons at the club. In 1988 he returned to his home state and signed up with West Coast and captained them in 1989. He finished his career back at Swan Districts.

External links
Murray Rance's playing statistics from WAFL Footy Facts

References

1962 births
Australian rules footballers from Western Australia
Living people
People from the Wheatbelt (Western Australia)
Swan Districts Football Club players
West Coast Eagles players
Western Bulldogs players
Western Australian State of Origin players
Australia international rules football team players